Sesame Street... 20 Years & Still Counting is a 1989 television special celebrating the 20th Anniversary of Sesame Street. Hosted by Bill Cosby, the special aired on Friday, April 7, 1989, on NBC. 

This special was originally produced by  The Children’s Television Workshop, in association with The Jim Henson Company (one of the few Sesame Street productions they directly produced, though an "Executive Producer for CTW" credit was included in the end credits) and was meant to air as part of The Jim Henson Hour, but ended up airing as a solo special the week before the premiere episode aired.

In the special, comedian Bill Cosby details the history of the show while interacting with various Muppet characters. Among the subjects featured are the curriculum, the show's adult humor and even the foreign co-productions from around the world (e.g. Plaza Sésamo—now Sésamo—and Rechov Sumsum). There are also guest appearances; opera singer Plácido Domingo sings with Placido Flamingo, and Ray Charles sings Kermit's version of the song "It's Not Easy Bein' Green".

Meanwhile, Bert and Ernie are taping the street with their video camera so they can watch Sesame Street on television, but Cookie Monster appears and eats both the video camera and the video tape. Bert, Ernie & Cookie Monster tell everybody on Sesame Street that they'll be sad because they don't like to watch Sesame Street anymore. Then comes Kermit the Frog in his "Sesame Street News" attire asking people (all of which are Grover) how to get to Sesame Street, occasionally running into people who were on the show when they were kids.

The show ends with the characters all singing "Sing". The program was dedicated to the memory of Joe Raposo.

Cast

Humans
 Emilio Delgado as Luis
 Sonia Manzano as Maria
 Bob McGrath as Bob
 Loretta Long as Susan
 Roscoe Orman as Gordon
 Miles Orman as Miles
 Linda Bove as Linda
 Bill McCutcheon as Uncle Wally
 Alison Bartlett as Gina
 Northern Calloway as David
 Jim Henson as himself

Jim Henson's Sesame Street Muppet Performers
Caroll Spinney as Big Bird and Oscar the Grouch
Frank Oz as Bert, Grover and Cookie Monster
Fran Brill as Prairie Dawn
Jerry Nelson as Count von Count and Herry Monster
Jim Henson as Ernie and Kermit the Frog
Kevin Clash as Elmo and Baby Natasha
Richard Hunt as Don Music and Placido Flamingo
Martin P. Robinson as Telly Monster and Snuffy
Bryant Young as Snuffy (back half)
Judy Sladky as Alice Snuffleupagus
Fred "Garbo" Garver as Barkley 
Camille Bonora as Ruby
Pam Arciero as Lavender Anything Muppet
David Rudman as Swiss
Additional Muppet Performers: Noel MacNeal (uncredited)

Nielsen ratings
The special ranked 68th out of 80 shows that week and brought in a 7.7/14 rating/share and was watched by around 12.6 million viewers, finishing third in its timeslot behind ABC's Perfect Strangers (13.0/25, 18.6 million, 44th) and Full House (14.6/26, 21.5 million, 30th), and CBS's Beauty and the Beast (10.7/20, 15.2 million, 55th).

References

1980s American television specials
Anniversary television episodes
Sesame Street features
NBC original programming
1989 television specials
1989 in American television
Television series reunion specials
Television series by Lionsgate Television